

Overview 

Radkan (also Romanized as Rādkān and Rādekān; also known as Rādkāh) is a city formally Radkan village in Radkan District, in the Chenaran County, Razavi Khorasan Province, Iran. At the 2021 census, its population was around 5k, in 1400 families.

Radkan city is known for its scenic beauty and historic architecture. It is a small city located in the Khorasan province in Iran and is known for its well-preserved traditional mud-brick houses and historical monuments, including a castle and caravanserai. The city is surrounded by mountains and is a popular destination for nature lovers, hikers and photographers. Additionally, the city is known for its natural hot springs and mineral water, which are believed to have therapeutic properties. Overall, Radkan city is a unique blend of natural beauty and historical significance, making it a must-visit destination for anyone traveling to Iran.

Radkan Tower 
The tower is a cylindrical structure made of mud bricks and is considered one of the oldest and most iconic landmarks in the city. It is believed to have been built during the Sassanian era (224-651 AD) and served as a fire temple, a religious shrine and a military fortress. The tower is now a protected national monument and attracts many tourists and history enthusiasts who come to admire its unique architectural style and rich history. The tower is a symbol of the city's cultural heritage and continues to be an important part of the local community's cultural identity.

the Radkan Tower is indeed a famous landmark in Radkan city and is one of the most popular tourist attractions in the area. Here are a few more interesting facts about the tower:

 Age: The tower is estimated to be over 1,000 years old, making it one of the oldest structures in the region.
 Architectural style: The tower is built in a traditional Persian style, with a cylindrical shape, several levels, and intricate decorative elements. The tower is considered to be a masterpiece of Persian architecture and is admired for its elegance and beauty.
 Purpose: The tower was originally built as a defensive structure and was used as a watchtower to keep an eye out for invading forces. The tower was also used as a place of refuge for local residents during times of conflict and unrest.
 Restoration: Over the centuries, the tower has undergone several renovations and restorations to maintain its structural integrity and preserve its historical significance. Today, the tower is a well-preserved monument to the city's rich cultural heritage.
 Tourist attraction: The tower is now one of the most popular tourist attractions in the city, attracting visitors from all over the world who are interested in exploring the city's history and culture. Visitors can climb to the top of the tower for panoramic views of the surrounding landscape and city.

Overall, the Radkan Tower is a must-visit attraction for anyone visiting Radkan city and provides a glimpse into the city's rich cultural heritage and history.

Other attractions 
In addition to the Radkan Tower, there are several other tourist attractions in Radkan city that are worth visiting. Some of these include:

 The Historical Caravanserai: A historic inn used by travelers and merchants along the ancient Silk Road. The caravanserai has been well-preserved and has now been converted into a museum, showcasing the city's rich cultural and historical heritage.
 The Radkan Castle: A medieval castle built on top of a hill overlooking the city. The castle offers panoramic views of the city and its surroundings and is a popular spot for picnicking and hiking.
 The Hot Springs: Radkan is known for its natural hot springs and mineral water, which are believed to have therapeutic properties. Visitors can relax in the hot springs and enjoy the scenic views of the surrounding mountains.
 The Natural Landscapes: The city is surrounded by picturesque mountains and valleys, making it a popular destination for nature lovers, hikers, and photographers.
 Tomb of Khajeh
 Jameh Mosque of Radkan

Aside from these attractions, there are also several local shops and markets in the city where visitors can purchase souvenirs and traditional handicrafts. Additionally, the local community is known for its hospitality and visitors can experience the local culture and cuisine by staying in traditional guesthouses and trying local dishes.

Other information 
There is much more to learn about Radkan city. Some additional points of interest:

 Culture and Religion: Radkan city has a rich cultural heritage, and the local community is known for its religious devotion and strong cultural traditions. Visitors can observe the local community's religious practices and learn about their cultural customs and traditions.
 Archaeological Sites: In addition to the Radkan Tower and Caravanserai, there are several other archaeological sites in the area that are of interest to historians and archaeologists. These include ancient ruins, historical cemeteries, and abandoned villages.
 Handicrafts and Textiles: Radkan is known for its traditional handicrafts and textiles, including hand-woven carpets, pottery, and ceramics. Visitors can visit local workshops and observe the traditional methods of production used to create these beautiful works of art.
 Cuisine: Radkan is known for its traditional cuisine, which is characterized by simple, hearty dishes made with locally-sourced ingredients. Visitors can sample local dishes such as kebabs, stews, and rice dishes at local restaurants and guesthouses.
 Wildlife: The surrounding mountains and valleys are home to a diverse range of wildlife, including mountain goats, deer, and a variety of bird species. Visitors can enjoy nature walks and wildlife viewing opportunities in the area.

Facts and Stories 
There are many interesting facts and stories about Radkan city which you could hear from locals but some of them are:

 The city was once an important center of trade and commerce along the ancient Silk Road. It was a key stopover point for merchants and travelers making their way across the region and was known for its thriving marketplaces and caravanserais.
 The city has a rich history of resistance and rebellion. During the Sassanian era, the city was the site of several battles between the local population and invading forces. In more recent times, the city has been a center of resistance against colonial powers and has been the site of several important uprisings and revolts.
 The city is surrounded by several scenic mountain ranges and is known for its beautiful natural landscapes. The mountains are home to a diverse range of flora and fauna, including rare and endangered species of plants and animals.
 The city has a long history of cultural and artistic expression. It is known for its traditional crafts, including weaving, pottery, and ceramics, and has been home to many famous poets, musicians, and artists over the centuries.
 The city is also known for its spiritual significance. It is said to be the birthplace of several important religious figures, and the local community is known for its religious devotion and strong cultural traditions. Visitors can visit historic shrines and religious sites in the city and experience the local community's spiritual practices and beliefs.

Radkan city is a relatively small and traditional city located in the Khorasan province of Iran. The local population is primarily made up of ethnic Persians, and the majority of the population is Muslim. The city is known for its strong cultural traditions and religious devotion.

The city has a relatively low population density and is not as urbanized as some of the larger cities in the region. The local economy is primarily based on agriculture, with a focus on crops such as wheat, barley, and fruit. There are also a number of small businesses and workshops in the city that specialize in traditional crafts such as weaving, pottery, and ceramics.

In terms of social and cultural activities, the city is known for its traditional festivals and religious events, which are attended by members of the local community and visitors alike. These events are often centered around music, dance, and other forms of artistic expression and are a great way to experience the local culture and interact with the local community.

The city is also known for its warm and friendly residents, who are known for their hospitality and welcoming nature. Visitors to the city often find the local community to be very open and welcoming, and many choose to return for future visits.

Accommodations 
Radkan city has several traditional Boom Gardi  accommodations, also known as traditional guesthouses, which offer visitors an authentic experience of the local culture and way of life. These accommodations are typically made of mud bricks and are designed to withstand earthquakes, a common occurrence in the region. They are characterized by their unique architectural style and rustic charm.

The boom gardi accommodations in Radkan city are known for their hospitality and comfort. They offer basic but clean and cozy rooms, and some also have communal spaces such as courtyards and sitting areas where guests can relax and interact with each other. Many of these guesthouses are run by local families and offer home-cooked meals made with fresh, locally-sourced ingredients.

Visitors can experience the local culture and way of life by staying in a boom gardi accommodation in Radkan city. These accommodations offer a unique and authentic travel experience that is often more affordable than staying in a hotel. They are also a great way to support the local community and contribute to the preservation of the city's cultural heritage.

References 

Populated places in Chenaran County